Standing on the Edge may refer to:
Standing on the Edge (John Berry album)
"Standing on the Edge of Goodbye", its title track
Standing on the Edge (Cheap Trick album)